Maradona - La mano de Dios, internationally released as Maradona, the Hand of God, is a 2007 Italian-Argentine biographical film directed by Marco Risi. It is based on real life events of footballer Diego Maradona.

Production 
The film was announced in 2005.

Critical reaction
Italian website Freequency gave it 3/5 stars.

Cast 
Marco Leonardi: Diego Armando Maradona (adult)
Abel Ayala: Diego Armando Maradona (adolescent)
Gonzalo Alarcon: Diego Armando Maradona (child)
Julieta Díaz: Claudia Villafañe de Maradona
Juan Leyrado: Guillermo Coppola
Roly Serrano: Chitoro
Pietro Taricone: Gianni

See also
The hand of God

References

External links

FilmFilm.it review (in Italian)
Corriere della sera review (in Italian)

Argentine biographical drama films
2007 films
2007 biographical drama films
Films directed by Marco Risi
Biographical films about sportspeople
Italian biographical drama films
Italian association football films
Cultural depictions of Diego Maradona
Films set in Argentina
Films shot in Argentina
2007 drama films
2000s Italian films
2000s Argentine films